Alberto Giolitti (November 14, 1923 – April 15, 1993) was an Italian-American comic book artist.

He was born in Rome, where his family held (and still hold) one of the most famous cafés, Giolitti, where he also worked for a while. He debuted as artist for Il Vittorioso in the late 1940s. After World War II, Giolitti moved to South America, where he worked for Editorial Lainez and Columba of Buenos Aires. After three years in there he was able to move to his original destination, the United States; there he became a mainstay of Western/Dell Publishing, penciling numerous characters, including Indian Chief, Sergeant Preston of the Yukon, Abraham Lincoln: Life Story, Tonto, Cisco Kid, Turok, and Gunsmoke.

After obtaining American citizenship, in 1960 he returned to Italy, from where he continued to collaborate with Western and other US and British publishers. Series he worked on in this period include Gold Key Comics' Star Trek and Edgar Rice Burroughs' Tarzan of the Apes. For the same company he drew a King Kong adaptation. In Rome he established a studio of comics artists, called Studio Giolitti after him.

In 1986 he realized a long science fiction story, "Cinque anni dopo" ("Five Years Later"), and from the late 1980s he finished several stories of the main Italian comics western character, Tex Willer.

Alberto Giolitti died in Rome.

External links
 
 Page at lambiek.net
 Giolitti as Star Trek artist

Artists from Rome
Italian emigrants to the United States
1993 deaths
1923 births
Italian expatriates in Argentina